Talan Teidit (also written Tala-n-Tehidit) is a village in the commune of Tamanrasset, in Tamanrasset District, Tamanrasset Province, Algeria,  south of the city of Tamanrasset in the Hoggar Mountains.

References

Neighbouring towns and cities

Populated places in Tamanrasset Province